Kirk Sutherland is a fictional character from the British ITV soap opera Coronation Street. The character first appeared on-screen during the episode airing on 22 May 2000, played by an uncredited actor and originally referred to as Mark. He has been played by Andrew Whyment since October 2000.

Storylines
Kirk first appears when Tyrone Dobbs (Alan Halsall) mistakenly believes that he is Maria Sutherland's (Samia Ghadie) boyfriend. Maria explains that Kirk (whom she refers to as "Mark") is her brother. Kirk briefly leaves Weatherfield after the mistake, but shortly returns soon after. He goes for a drink with local resident Steve (Simon Gregson).

Kirk reappears after being kicked out of The Rovers Return by landlord Fred Elliott (John Savident), who believes him to be too young to drink. He is the older brother of Maria, with whom he owns Weatherfield Kennels. Kirk is good friends with Tyrone and Jason Grimshaw (Ryan Thomas) and an ex-boyfriend of Fiz Stape (Jennie McAlpine) whom he had met at a flat-decorating party. He is also friends with Les Battersby (Bruce Jones), with whom he once lived, acting as best man at his wedding to Cilla Brown (Wendi Peters). He also grew quite close to Cilla's son, Chesney (Sam Aston), while he was with Fiz. Kirk dumps Fiz after he finds out that she had spent the night at her ex-boyfriend Tyrone's house.

Kirk meets Thelma Clegg, who hires him to shampoo her poodle. She is so impressed that she asks him to call round to her house regularly. Fiz is suspicious and follows Kirk to Thelma's house where she can see Kirk being entertained by Thelma belly-dancing in her living room. Kirk professes his innocence and says Thelma would not let him out of the house. Kirk loses the kennels, following a lawsuit over the accidental neutering of a pedigree specimen, and within a week proposes to his girlfriend, Fiz. She dumps him immediately and tells him that she no longer wants to be with him. She leaves Kirk to be with her first love, John Stape (Graeme Hawley), leaving Kirk feeling broken and humiliated. Later that month, Kirk and Jamie Baldwin (Rupert Hill) rescue Claire Peacock (Julia Haworth), Kirk's next-door-neighbour from her burning house. As a reward, Claire's husband, Ashley (Steven Arnold) gives Kirk a job at his butcher's shop. After Cilla receives £45,000 for a necklace, she lets Kirk know first and leaves the street for Las Vegas. Kirk is left to look after her son, Chesney. Kirk fails to provide adequate care for Chesney, and he is subsequently taken into foster care. When Fiz returns from a holiday, she is furious but forgives Kirk. She manages to get Chesney home but she has to move in with them, making Kirk believe she still has feelings for him.

Kirk leaves to visit his parents in Cyprus for several weeks. In the days leading up to his return, Fiz dreads him coming home, while she is providing a home for Chesney. On his return, he breaks the news that he has a new girlfriend called Julie Carp (Katy Cavanagh), whom he fell in love with in Cyprus. Fiz has taken a dislike to Julie, who then moved in with them at their house.

Kirk's nephew Paul Jr is stillborn and he consoles his grieving sister. His brother-in-law Liam Connor (Rob James-Collier) dies in a hit and run incident and his parents return to comfort their daughter over the loss of her husband. In November 2008, Kirk, Chesney and later Fiz visit Cilla in South Africa, only to find she's up to her old tricks again. She enters a competition for $500,000 and Kirk poses as a mentally disabled boy, Chesney as a paralysed boy, Cilla's new "Les" as "old" Les and Fiz as a nun. While on a safari, Kirk saves them from a bush near wild animals. The "family" lose the competition when Chesney reveals Cilla's lies after she lied about 'returning' to Weatherfield. In March of 2009, Julie admits she thinks she's pregnant, but it turns out to be a false alarm. After this, Kirk begins to see that they are drifting apart, as they are too different, and he ends their relationship. However, Kirk supports Julie after the revelation that Colin Grimshaw (Edward DeSouza), Eileen's (Sue Cleaver) father, is also her father.

Kirk decides to move out of No. 5, as he feels he is in the way of Fiz's life. He packs his bags and leaves, only to turn up next door at Maria's. A few weeks later, he decides to pack and move in with Tyrone and Molly (Vicky Binns). He then moves out and back into Maria's when she goes to stay in Ireland with the baby at Liam's parent's house after Tony Gordon (Gray O'Brien) admits to having Liam killed. Kirk applies for a job at Underworld as a machinist but ultimately loses out to Izzy Armstrong (Cherylee Houston). However, owner Carla Connor (Alison King) offers him a job as a delivery driver. Kirk soon forms a strong friendship with Izzy, and as a result, his feelings for her grow stronger. When Gary Windass (Mikey North) is arrested for assaulting a lad who was hassling Izzy, Kirk makes a false statement to the police that it was him who committed the crime. As a result, Gary's military career is not put in jeopardy and this is a relief to Izzy, who has started to harbour feelings for Gary, much to Kirk's dismay. The charges against Kirk are dropped to a lack of sufficient evidence, and he is a free man.

Kirk helps Tyrone come to terms with the fact that baby Jack is not his son as he and Maria visit him on Christmas Day. He is later kicked out along with Maria by a frustrated and angry Tyrone. Kirk attends Peter Barlow's (Chris Gascoyne) wedding renewal to Leanne Battersby (Jane Dawson) he arrives with Maria and her boyfriend Chris Gray (Will Thorp) he informs Peter that everyone has arrived and that they can start the ceremony. Kirk, Tyrone, Gary, and Tommy abduct Leon Southam, whose girlfriend is harassing Fiz in prison. They hold him hostage in the empty butcher's shop and figure out how they will get out of it, only for Norris to find Leon and perform a citizen's arrest on him. Leon is sent back to jail for violating his parole and Norris is hailed as a hero, only for his fifteen minutes to expire immediately when a drunken Carla crashes into the bookies and almost kills Stella Price (Michelle Collins).

In July, Kirk is put in charge of helping colleague Michelle's son Ryan Connor (Sol Heras) in the packing department at Underworld as Michelle is punishing Ryan for an incident involving setting fire to Steve McDonald's (Simon Gregson) house. While left alone, Ryan takes advantage and fakes a severe injury in order to take time off. Michelle and Rob Donovan (Marc Baylis) take Ryan to hospital, but no injuries are shown. However, later, Ryan announces that he plans to sue Underworld. Months later, Kirk meets Beth Tinker (Lisa George) and begins a relationship with her. In January 2015, Kirk and Beth get married in a 1980s themed wedding, and then spend the night together at a posh hotel, as a wedding gift from Carla. In June 2016, Kirk accompanies Beth to her school reunion in which Beth insults Kirk in front of an old school rival. Kirk then moves in with Norris Cole (Malcolm Hebden) as Norris is lonely, they become very close as they spend several evenings playing board games. Beth eventually wins Kirk back in a plan set up by Chesney and girlfriend Sinead.

Casting

Whyment resigned from Coronation Street in September 2003, in order to appear in the latest addition to the Carry On series - Carry On London. However, after the film's scripts were delayed, and amidst rumours that it would perform poorly, Whyment pulled out and returned to Coronation Street in a £60,000 deal.

In 2012, Whyment said that he was committed to staying with Coronation Street. As he was in his eleventh year of playing the role and it remained "great"; he hoped it would be "a job for life".

Development
In 2013, it was announced that Kirk would start a romance with Beth Tinker (Lisa George). Their relationship begins when Kirk rescues Beth from a date who becomes aggressive with her. Talking about the romance, Lisa George said "Usually the viewers only see Beth as the really gobby person in the factory. But there are some really nice, tender little moments in this storyline, and Beth is quite open and honest with Kirk. I think it's really nice that the audience will get to see that."

Reception

For his portrayal of Kirk, Whyment was awarded "Best Comedy Performance" at the 2003 British Soap Awards.  He won the award for the funniest character at 2004 Inside Soap Awards. Laura Morgan of All About Soap wrote that she "simply could not imagine" Coronation Street without Kirk and his "gormless grin". In 2004, Ian Hyland of the Sunday Mirror questioned whether there was a "better comic actor in Britain today than Andrew Whyment". Kirk and Beth's wedding was described as "possibly the tackiest event in soap all year" in the Inside Soap Yearbook 2016.

References

External links
Kirk Sutherland at itv.com

Coronation Street characters
Television characters introduced in 2000
Fictional factory workers
Fictional butchers
Fictional singers
Male characters in television